Zaitseve is an urban-type settlement in Bakhmut Raion of Donetsk Oblast in Ukraine under the occupation of Russia. Population:

History 
Pro-Russian forces took the settlement under their control in the beginning of the War in Donbass, in 2014.

Ukrainian forces have the settlement under control since the second half of 2015.

The war has brought both civilian and military casualties. The settlement is located near the frontline between Ukrainian forces and the separatist Donetsk People's Republic in the War in Donbass. It is one of the suburbs of Horlivka that stayed under Ukrainian army control, unlike Horlivka which is under separatist control since April 2014. To facilitate the administration, the Ukrainian government transferred Zaitseve from the city of Horlivka to Bakhmut Raion, which is under the control of the central government.

On February 21, 2022, pro-Russian rebels shelled the town, killing two soldiers. A civilian in the nearby village of Novoluhanske, 51 year old Roman Shyrokiy, also died, becoming the war's first civilian casualty in 2022. Volodymyr Zelenskyy voiced a condemnation of the incident.

On October 6, 2022, according to the Russian Ministry of Defence, Zaitseve passed under Russian control.

Demographics
Native language as of the Ukrainian Census of 2001:
Russian 93.15%
Ukrainian 6.48%

References

External links

 SUMMARY INFORMATION FROM АТО – 06.12.2015 (VIDEO)

Media Coverage
 Zaitseve, search results on string "Zaitseve" in Information Resistance.

Urban-type settlements in Bakhmut Raion
Yekaterinoslav Governorate